Mistakes Were Made is the second solo album and fifteenth studio album release overall by Spencer Albee. The album was released in stores on April 28, 2015, with a release party at Port City Music Hall on May 29, 2015.

Track listing
"Mistakes Were Made" - 4:10
"So Bad (Open Letter to the Damned Part 2)" - 4:08
"I'm Right Here (feat. Kat Wright)" - 3:18
"Put Your Sweatshirt On" - 2:00
"Hold Me Close" - 2:48
"This Will Be Our Year" - 2:05
"Why Am I a Fool?" - 2:06
"Something Something Broken Heart" - 2:57
"One2three" - 4:32
"I Don't Know" - 2:58
"Love Is Not Enough" - 3:40
"So Long" - 2:26
"Come Home" - 4:38

References

2015 albums
Spencer Albee albums